Cülyan (also, Dzhyul’yan and Dzhul’yan) is a village and municipality in the Ismailli Rayon of Azerbaijan.  It has a population of 1,262.

References 

Populated places in Ismayilli District